The CERN ritual hoax is a found footage video that depicts a supposed occult ritual occurring in the grounds of CERN, a European particle physics research organization. The video shows several people dressed in black cloaks surrounding a statue of the Hindu deity Shiva and apparently stabbing a woman in a human sacrifice. The video ended with the person filming crying out and running away.

The video became popular in August 2016, buoyed by many existing conspiracy theories concerning CERN. CERN later stated in its FAQ that the video was "fiction" and the actions violated its professional guidelines.

Reactions 
A CERN spokesperson stated that the video was a prank and that no one was actually harmed. The mock ritual was performed without any official permission. CERN stated that it "doesn't tolerate this kind of spoof" and that it can "give rise to misunderstandings about the scientific nature of our work".

The video caused controversy both by creating mockery of existing theories and by fueling existing conspiracy theories about CERN activities. Even though the video was taken in front of a statue of Dancing Shiva/Nataraja, some believed it was a satanic ritual. This further fueled theories that CERN's goal was to use their Large Hadron Collider to create a portal to hell, summon the antichrist, or destroy the universe.

References 

CERN
Internet hoaxes
Satanic ritual abuse
2016 hoaxes
Religious hoaxes
Controversies in Switzerland
Science and technology-related conspiracy theories